Field Marshal Sir Kaiser Shumsher Jang Bahadur Rana, GBE (8 January 1892 – 7 June 1964) was a field marshal in the Royal Nepalese Army. He was the third son of Maharaja Sir Chandra Shamsher Jang Bahadur Rana, GCB, GCSI, GCMG, GCVO the fifth Prime Minister of Nepal of the Rana dynasty and Bada Maharani Chandra Loka Bhaktha Rajya Lakshmi.

Early life
He was the younger brother of Shree Tin Maharaja Sir Mohan Shamsher Jang Bahadur Rana and Sir Baber Shamsher Jang Bahadur Rana. From 1909 for some years he had Basanta Kumar Mallik.

Family
Kaiser Shamsher married twice and had five sons and five daughters. On 20 April 1904 he married his first wife at the Narayanhity Royal Palace in Kathmandu, Princess Lakshmi Rajya Laxmi Devi of Nepal (1895–1954), the then heir apparent and eldest daughter of King Prithvi Bir Bikram Shah of Nepal. In 1943 at Kaiser Mahal in Kathmandu, Kaiser Shamsher married Krishna Chandra Kumari Devi, daughter of Mukunda Bahadur Singh, of Bajura.

Later life
During his lifetime Kaiser Shamsher occupied various posts and had many responsibilities both in the civil and the military administration. In 1901 he was appointed major general. In 1920 Kaiser Shamsher became a lieutenant general. In 1922–1930 he served as the chairman of the Kathmandu municipality. Later he was the Southern commanding general (1934–1945) and Eastern commanding general (1945–1947). Kaiser Shamsher worked as director general of various institutions, such as the Royal Museum (1928–1939), the Archaeology Department (1931–1939), and the Foreign Affairs Department (1932–1937). As a foreign minister of Nepal, he attended the ceremony of Coronation of King George VI and Queen Elizabeth on 12 May 1937 at Westminster Abbey in London. In 1947–48 Kaiser Shamsher was appointed as Nepal's ambassador to the Court of St. James. In 1951–53 he was commander-in-chief. He also served as minister of Defence (1951–1955) and minister of finance and administration (1952–53). In 1956 Kaiser Shamsher was promoted to field marshal. Kaiser Shamsher died on 7 June 1964 at the age of 72.

Wealth 
Kaiser Shumsher owned Kaiser Castle at Banaras Cantt in Banaras, India. The building was given out (free of rent) to the Zoological Survey of India from 1942 to 1949. A species of crustacean Nichollsia kashiense is found to have been discovered in the castle area.

Kaiser Library

Kaiser Shumsher Jang Bahadur Rana was an avid book collector, and his personal library at the Kaiser Mahal is now open to the public. The Kaiser Library is situated in the Keshar Mahal near the Western Gate of the Narayanhity Royal Palace. The library, unique for its architecture, houses more than sixty thousand books, documents, periodicals and manuscripts. and is one of the oldest libraries in Nepal. From a very young age Kaiser Shamsher bought and collected books and newspapers, and visited England with his father. He was very much impressed by the government of England, as well as by the library system and the proper management of books there. Book collection was his hobby and his visit to Britain & British libraries led to the increase in the number of his books and change in the structure of his own library. From England, he brought back with him many books to Kathmandu. Access to the library was limited to the members of his family, special people of the nation and special visitors from abroad. In his will he bequeathed his library to the government, thereby making it a national property accessible to all. It was established in 1969 A.D. with the donated personal collection by his widow Krishna Chandra Kumari Devi.

Honours

National honours 
 Member of the Order of Ojaswi Rajanya, 1st Class.
 Member of the Order of Om Rama Pata, 1st Class.
 Member of the Order of the Three Divine Powers, 1st. Class.
 Member of the Order of Gurkha Right Hand, 1st. Class.
 Great Earthquake Medal (1935).
 Royal Jubilee Medal (11 December 1936).
 Long Service Medal.
 King Mahendra Coronation Medal (2 May 1956).

Foreign honours 
  : Delhi Durbar Medal (12 December 1911).
  : King George VI Coronation Medal (1937).
  : Honorary Knight Commander of the Order of the British Empire (KBE – 17 January 1924).
  : Honorary Knight Grand Cross of the Order of the British Empire (GBE – 29 April 1937).
  : Knight Grand Cross of the Order of the Legion of Honour (24 May 1934).

See also
Garden of Dreams
Rana Dynasty
Rana palaces of Nepal

References

Members of the Order of Tri Shakti Patta, First Class
Members of the Order of Gorkha Dakshina Bahu, First Class
Honorary Knights Grand Cross of the Order of the British Empire
Honorary Knights Commander of the Order of the British Empire
Grand Croix of the Légion d'honneur
Finance ministers of Nepal
Nepalese military personnel
1892 births
1964 deaths
Nepalese royalty
Ambassadors of Nepal to the United Kingdom
Rana regime
20th-century Nepalese nobility
19th-century Nepalese nobility
Children of prime ministers of Nepal
Nepalese Hindus